David Vaudreuil (born December 21, 1966) is an American former professional soccer player whose career spanned fifteen teams in over six leagues including seven seasons in Major League Soccer. He is the former head coach of Tulsa Roughnecks FC. Vaudreuil was terminated halfway through the Tulsa Roughnecks FC 2018 season.

Player

Youth
Born in Hawaii, Vaudreuil grew up in Canton, Connecticut where he was a 1983 high school All American soccer player at Canton High School.  He was a member of the school's 1981 state championship soccer team.  He graduated in 1984, was inducted into the school's Wall of Fame in 2006 and was inducted into the Connecticut Soccer Hall of Fame in 2007.  In 1984, Vaudreuil entered Princeton University, playing on the men's soccer team from 1984 to 1987  He graduated in 1988 with a bachelor's degree in East Asian History.

Professional
Vaudreuil began his professional career in 1989 with the Washington Stars in the American Soccer League.  That fall, he signed with the Baltimore Blast of the Major Indoor Soccer League.  In 1990, the Blast went to the MISL championship series where they fell to the San Diego Sockers.  On October 18, 1991, Vaudreuil signed with the expansion Harrisburg Heat in the National Professional Soccer League.  He spent one season in Harrisburg.  In September 1992, the Cleveland Crunch selected Vaudreuil in the NPSL Expansion Draft then traded him to the Milwaukee Wave in exchange for Tim Barto, Mark Kerlin and Bill Andracki on October 19, 1992.  During this season, he moved from midfield to defense, a position he remained in for the rest of his career.  He would play three indoor seasons in Milwaukee before moving to the Baltimore Spirit in 1995.  However, he also continued to sporadically play outdoor soccer.  On June 5, 1993, he signed with the Tampa Bay Rowdies of the American Professional Soccer League.  The team went to the playoff semifinals then folded at the end of the season.  Then in 1995, he joined the Houston Force, an expansion team in the USISL.  The team played only one game, a 3–0 loss to the Los Angeles Salsa, then folded seven days later.  He then moved to the New York Centaurs of the A-League for the rest of the season.  In 1994, he played for Puebla F.C. when it won a Mexican indoor championship.  In the fall of 1995, Vaudreuil moved to the Baltimore Spirit for the 1995–1996 NPSL season.  On February 4, 1996, Los Angeles Galaxy selected Vaudreuil in the second round (seventeenth overall) of the 1996 MLS Supplemental Draft.  The Galaxy waived him on March 26, 1996.  He then signed with the Hampton Roads Mariners in the USISL.  On May 16, 1996, the Mariners sent him on loan to D.C. United of Major League Soccer.  He transferred to United on June 28.  He spent two seasons in D.C., winning two MLS championships.  On November 6, 1997, the Miami Fusion selected him with the second pick of the 1997 MLS Expansion Draft.  On August 14, 1998, Miami traded Vaudreuil to the Colorado Rapids in exchange for Tyrone Marshall and Jason Boyce.  He played two season in Colorado before being released at the end of the 2000 season.  On February 23, 2001 he moved back to the Baltimore Blast.  In the spring of 2001, Vaudreuil joined the Connecticut Wolves in the USL First Division.  On July 3, 2001, the Chicago Fire signed Vaudreuil as a discovery player.  He spent two seasons in Chicago, going on loan to the Milwaukee Rampage for one game in 2001.

Coach
In 1992, Vaudreuil served as an assistant coach with DePaul University's men's soccer team while he took graduate courses at the university.  On January 10, 2003, Vaudreuil was hired as the head coach of the Jersey Shore Boca in the Premier Development League.  On February 9, 2004, the Atlanta Silverbacks of the USL First Division hired Vaudreuil as head coach.  On June 15, 2005, the Silverbacks fired Vaudreuil after he had compiled a 17–16–6 record over two years.  On September 15, 2005, he became an assistant coach with the Chicago Storm.  He then spent the fall of 2006 as the Executive Director for Chivas USA.  He then moved Hollywood United where he served as head coach in 2007. As of August 3, 2009 he was appointed as the head coach for the Los Angeles Galaxy U-18. He was the Director of coaching  for the Connecticut PSE Rush franchise.  He is a former Assistant Coach for the New England Revolution MLS Soccer club.

In addition to his playing and coaching careers, Vaudreuil served as an Executive Committee Member of the Major League Soccer Players Association from 1997 to 2002. He was inducted into the Connecticut Soccer Hall of Fame in 2007.

References

External links
A Major League Success Soccer star
 MISL stats

1966 births
Living people
American Professional Soccer League players
American soccer coaches
American soccer players
Atlanta Silverbacks coaches
Soccer players from Honolulu
American Soccer League (1988–89) players
Baltimore Blast (1980–1992) players
Baltimore Blast (NPSL) players
Baltimore Spirit players
DePaul Blue Demons men's soccer coaches
Chicago Fire FC players
Colorado Rapids players
Connecticut Wolves players
D.C. United players
Virginia Beach Mariners players
Harrisburg Heat players
Houston Force players
Major Indoor Soccer League (1978–1992) players
Major League Soccer players
Miami Fusion players
Milwaukee Rampage players
Milwaukee Wave players
National Professional Soccer League (1984–2001) players
New York Centaurs players
Princeton Tigers men's soccer players
Club Puebla players
Tampa Bay Rowdies (1975–1993) players
Washington Stars players
Sportspeople from Honolulu
USL Second Division players
USISL Select League players
A-League (1995–2004) players
LA Galaxy draft picks
People from Canton, Connecticut
FC Tulsa coaches
Association football defenders